This is a list of the French SNEP Top 100 Singles and Top 200 Albums number-ones of 2012.

Number ones by week

Singles chart

Albums chart

As compiled by Charts in France including both digital and physical sales, not representing SNEP charts.

See also
2012 in music
List of number-one hits (France)
List of top 10 singles in 2012 (France)

References

Number-one hits
France
2012